Burevestnik was a Russian language Bolshevik newspaper published from Tbilisi (Tiflis), Georgia in 1917. 

It was one of the most important Bolshevik organs in the city at the time.

References

Mass media in Tbilisi
Newspapers published in Georgia (country)
Socialist newspapers
Publications established in 1917
1917 establishments in Georgia (country)
1910s in Georgia (country)